Edward Bates was a department store located in Chatham, Kent with a subsidiary Blake & Co based in Maidstone.

History
In 1869 Edward Bates opened a drapery shop in partnership with a Mr Paine at the age of 18. By 1871 the partnership was dissolved and by 1877 the business had grown to four shops. However at the age of 45 in 1896 Edward had died leaving his son Edward II in charge of the business at the age of 24.

In 1900 the business moved from the four separate shops to one location at 94-96 High Street, Chatham. Edward II was a campaigner for better working conditions for employees and was co-founder of the Chatham Tradesman Association (now Medway Chambers of Commerce).

The business was incorporated in 1921, and a year later Edward III son of Edward II joined the business eventually taking over as Managing Director, a position he held until 1966, when his son Edward IV took over the position. In 1963 the store again moved to new premises at 125 High Street, Chatham, and in 1966 the store became members of the Associated Department Stores group. The business expanded again in 1969 by buying a department store in Maidstone called Blake & Son.

The business continued to operate until the late 1970s when first Blake & Son was closed in 1978, and in 1979 Edward Bates was sold to Bentalls department store group. The store was rebranded as Bentalls.

References

Defunct department stores of the United Kingdom
Defunct retail companies of the United Kingdom
1869 establishments in England
Retail companies established in 1869